William Zebulon Foster (February 25, 1881 – September 1, 1961) was a radical American labor organizer and Communist politician, whose career included serving as  General Secretary of the Communist Party USA from 1945 to 1957. He was previously a member of the Socialist Party of America and the Industrial Workers of the World, leading the drive to organize the packinghouse industry during World War I and the steel strike of 1919.

Biography

Early years
He was born William Edward Foster in Taunton, Massachusetts, on February 24, 1881, the son of a Fenian, James Foster, who had fled County Carlow after the failure of the revolutionary Fenian Rising in Ireland and the waves of arrests that drove hundreds of others out of the country. His mother, Elizabeth McLoughlin, was an English Catholic textile worker. During his peripatetic childhood his mother had nine surviving children of 23 babies she bore.

His family moved to the Irish area of Skittereen within the Moyamensing neighborhood of South Philadelphia, where his father worked as a stableman and was part of a group of Irish-American Fenians. Foster left school at the age of ten to apprentice himself to a dye sinker. Foster left that position three years later to work in a white lead factory. Over the next ten years he worked in fertilizer plants in Reading, Pennsylvania and Jacksonville, Florida, as a railroad construction worker and sawmill employee in Florida, as a streetcar motorman in New York City, as a lumber camp and longshoreman in Portland, Oregon and as a sailor. Foster even homesteaded for a year in Oregon in 1905, although he also worked a series of odd jobs as a miner, sheepherder, sawmill worker and railroad employee during that year before abandoning the farm.

Entry into politics and trade union work

Foster joined the Socialist Party of America in 1901 and was a member in the party's Washington state affiliate until he left the party in the midst of a faction fight. Foster then joined the Industrial Workers of the World (IWW) in 1909, when he took part in one of the IWW's free speech fights in Spokane, Washington.

Foster became a prominent figure within the union, serving as its representative at an international labor conference in Budapest in 1911 and a contributor to its papers. Foster's politics, however, were moving him away from the IWW. He became a committed syndicalist after touring Europe in 1910 and 1911, and criticized the IWW for not working within established unions or within the workshop in any event. He urged American leftists to enter the AFL unions, rather than establish rival unions, as the IWW had tried to do. He also denounced electoral politics as a dead end that smothered the revolutionary ardor of these groups by channeling their energies into pursuit of office, with all the compromises that entails. Foster lost the battle, however, and soon thereafter left the IWW and formed his own organization, the Syndicalist League of North America (SLNA).

The SLNA's policies — direct action at the shopfloor-level leading to workers' governance of society, but without the dead weight of bureaucratic structures — bore a strong resemblance to the anarchist thinking of the day. That is not coincidental, since Foster was not only lecturing at anarchist groups and settlements, but became a close working associate with Jay Fox, an anarchist with roots in the Chicago labor movement, and married Ester Abramowitz, who had belonged to an anarchist collective in Washington. Among the other members of the SLNA were Tom Mooney (who became a labor martyr when imprisoned for allegedly throwing a bomb at a Preparedness Day parade in 1916), Earl Browder, an accountant and union activist in Kansas City and Foster's rival for the Presidency of the Communist Party twenty years later, and James P. Cannon, a member of the IWW and one of Foster's allies in the internal warfare within the CPUSA until he was expelled for Trotskyism. The SLNA, however, was never an effective force and folded in 1914.

Foster took his own advice and became a union business agent for a local of the Brotherhood of Railway Carmen of America in Chicago. He continued his syndicalist campaign, this time through the International Trade Union Educational League, while obtaining a position as a general organizer for the AFL in 1915. His syndicalism led him to drop any criticism of the more conservative union leaders; in his eyes, organizing workers was a step toward dismantling capitalism. The ITUEL did not so much seek to take power in those organizations in which its members were active, as to steer them in a more progressive direction.

Foster also tempered his politics at this time: he not only did not publicly oppose the United States' entry into the war, as Eugene V. Debs, Victor Berger and figures associated with the IWW had done, but helped sell war bonds in 1918. Foster also remained quiet when the government arrested hundreds of IWW activists, convicting them en masse in 1918.

Foster did not, on the other hand, become wholly apolitical. The Chicago Federation of Labor (CFL), headed by John Fitzpatrick, was a nest for a number of labor causes: the campaign to free Tom Mooney, plans to launch a labor party, and, most importantly, programs to organize the thousands of unskilled workers in the city's packinghouses, steel mills and other mass production industries.

Organizing packinghouse workers

Unions had tried to organize the packinghouses for decades before World War I: the Knights of Labor had led organizing drives among these workers in the 1870s and 1880s, while the Amalgamated Meat Cutters and Butcher Workmen had made gains among the many diverse ethnic groups working in the industry in the first decade of the century. In both cases the industry, now concentrated in the hands of a few large and powerful corporations, drove the unions out.

The war, however, changed things. The demand for meat increased tremendously during the war, while the draft and the difficulty of importing more workers from Europe led to labor shortages that reduced the number of persons willing to scab in the event of a strike. In addition, the federal government had an interest in maintaining production unimpeded and avoiding the disruption that a strike of 50,000 packinghouse workers would entail. This was an especially propitious time to organize these workers on an industrial basis; as Foster said, "The gods were indeed fighting on the side of labor".

Before the CFL could organize these workers, however, it had to work out the competing claims of all of the various unions that claimed the right to represent segments of the industry. Rather than create a wholly new organization, which would have immediately found itself fighting other unions in the CFL over jurisdiction, Foster hit on the idea of creating a Stockyards Labor Council (SLC) that, like the railroad federations that had recently come into being, would fuse all of the interested unions into a single body with the ability to organize the industry as a whole. Foster obtained the endorsement of his union, the Railway Carmen, for this plan then took the proposal to Local 87 of the Meat Cutters, who supported it enthusiastically and obtained the approval of the CFL on July 15, 1917. The SLC was formed a week later, with representatives from all of the crafts — machinists, electricians, carpenters, coopers, office workers, steamfitters, engineers, railway carmen, and firemen. While this body was only a coalition created for the purpose of organizing workers, and would not have had the authority to bargain for them as a single group, it was an important step toward industrial unionism. Foster was the secretary for the SLC.

Another factor posed a serious obstacle to organizing packinghouse workers: many of the unions in the SLC excluded African-Americans from membership, either overtly or in practice. Thousands of recent African-American migrants from the South had gone to work in the packinghouses and many looked upon their employers as more interested in their welfare than the unions that had either excluded them or shown no interest in organizing them. The SLC, for its part, offered membership in federal unions affiliated directly with the AFL, only to have this offer thrown back at it as "Jim Crow unionism". The same pattern of division prevailed among immigrant workers, who organized along national or linguistic lines.

While privately convinced that launching a strike under these conditions would be a mistake, and aware that the AFL leadership felt even more strongly on this subject, Foster nonetheless continued to organize as if a strike was in the offing. The rank and file workers voted overwhelmingly in November, 1917 and more moderate leaders, such as Fitzpatrick and the leader of Local 87, used this strike threat to great advantage in negotiating with the federal government and the employers.

The Wilson administration wanted to bring about a peaceful resolution of this dispute and put great pressure on the employers to agree to arbitration of the issues in dispute — wages, hours of work, and union recognition — without a strike, even threatening to seize the plants as a wartime measure if necessary. While the unions had their own reservations about arbitration, they also agreed to it rather than find themselves forced to strike. The arbitrator's initial award, ordering the eight-hour day, overtime pay and significant wage increases, was a major victory for the workers. The Amalgamated Meat Cutters' membership doubled in the months that followed.

Those gains were short-lived, however. The arbitration award had not required the employers to recognize the unions, leading some workers to believe that the government, not the SLC, was responsible for these improvements in their wages and hours. In addition, the Amalgamated Meat Cutters attempted to claim all of the members as its own, breaking off relations with the SLC. Race riots in Chicago in 1919 dissolved what little trust black packinghouse workers had in white-led unions. Once the arbitration award expired in 1919 employers fired union activists; by 1922, after a failed strike, the SLC was defunct.

The steel strike of 1919

Foster turned his attention, while the packinghouse campaign was still underway, to another project: organizing steel workers. The problems here were even more complex: in addition to the history of defeated strikes and the deep ethnic divisions within the workforce, the steel mills were also divided by differences in skills, with the higher paid native-born skilled workers often looking down on their immigrant coworkers, who were often unskilled or semiskilled. Foster proposed a similar strategy, but on a much larger scale: a national campaign, led by a union council of all the craft unions and the Amalgamated Association of Iron, Tin and Steel Workers, that would organize all of basic steel simultaneously. Fitzpatrick agreed to put his name on the project and sent Foster as the CFL's delegate to the AFL's 1918 convention to present the plan.

The AFL's reception was tepid: it endorsed a special conference to create a committee to organize steel workers, but each international union contributed only one hundred dollars apiece — leaving the committee with somewhat less than the $250,000 Foster estimated it needed. Many unions did, on the other hand contribute organizers, whom Foster used as his base.

Without the funds to launch a truly national campaign, Foster decided to start close to home, sending organizers into Gary, Indiana, and South Chicago, where they received a tumultuous outpouring of support, in August 1918. The Chicago area was not, however, the heart of the steel industry; the Monongahela Valley was.

By the time that Foster sent organizers into that area several months later, however, the influenza epidemic had led the authorities to bar all public meetings; the announcement of the armistice soon led to widespread layoffs in the mills. The union no longer could rely on a tight labor market or a federal government interested in labor peace. The union faced other problems: the rivalries spurred by the constituent unions' self-interest and the omnipresent power of the industry, which had turned the Valley into a large version of a company town.

Even so, the National Committee for Organizing Iron and Steel Workers managed to sign up more than 100,000 steel workers by early 1919. The strike vote, taken in August 1919, was almost unanimous in favor of a strike. When the steel companies refused to meet with union officials, 250,000 steelworkers went out on strike on September 22.

The National Committee's organizing efforts had produced mixed results: while it enrolled around 350,000 steelworkers during the course of the strike, its greatest strength was among immigrant workers. Higher skilled native born workers gave the strike only lukewarm support, while black steelworkers gave it almost none at all in the Pittsburgh area and less than enthusiastic support elsewhere.

The authorities attacked with their customary violence: within ten days fourteen people had been killed, all of them strikers or strike sympathizers. Vigilantes expelled Foster from Johnstown, Pennsylvania, at gunpoint. Foster himself became the focus of a Congressional inquiry that was originally initiated to study the causes of the strike. In the meantime authorities barred strikers from meeting.

Foster spent most of his time raising money and organizing material assistance for strikers and their families. In the meantime General Leonard Wood imposed martial law in Gary while authorities in Pennsylvania broke up strike meetings wherever they could be found. By November, as funds were running low, the strike was losing steam. Foster and the other members of the committee voted to end it in January, 1920. Foster resigned from the committee in order to allow it to continue its work "with a clean slate".

Joining the Communist Party

After his resignation from the National Committee following the defeat of the steel workers strike, Foster was at loose ends. He resigned his position as a Brotherhood of Railway Carmen organizer, but was blacklisted from other jobs on the railroad. He still maintained his friendship with John Fitzpatrick, wrote a book analyzing the steel strike and founded the Trade Union Educational League, which received financial support from the Amalgamated Clothing Workers of America, the left-led union that had contributed $100,000 for relief for steel strikers.

Foster had contacts with a number of members of the newly formed Communist Party, but had not joined it after its split from the Socialist Party of America in 1919. The party had, in fact, denounced him personally during the strike as an opportunist and class collaborator, calling him "E.Z. Foster" for the accommodations he was willing to make with the AFL leadership. The CP at this time was still convinced that the revolution was impending; its suggested slogan during the steel strike was "Make the strike general and seize state power!"

Foster was brought closer within the party's orbit, however, after Earl Browder invited him to attend a conference of the Profintern, the Red International of Labor Unions, in Moscow in 1921. There he was appointed the Profintern's agent in the United States; the TUEL was later made an affiliate of the Profintern in 1923. Foster joined the CPUSA on his return to the United States.

The Trade Union Educational League

The TUEL, like the ITUEL and SLNA before it, sought to encourage the development of left activists within the established unions and unite those already there around a platform of industrial unionism, and to support the militant struggle for workers' rights. In its early years Foster's TUEL pursued a course of its own, not attempting to line up its policies with Comintern or Profintern directives or taking direction from the CPUSA. When party leaders complained, the Profintern sided with Foster.

The TUEL took pains to avoid accusations of dual unionism; when the Profintern requested that TUEL start building itself as a mass membership organization Foster demurred, maintaining TUEL as a network of activists with no formal membership. TUEL was strongest in Chicago, where Foster and Jack Johnstone had close relations with Fitzpatrick and many other unionists with a background in labor radicalism. TUEL campaigned for amalgamation of unions into larger, stronger ones—an echo of the IWW's advocacy of "one big union"—and creation of a Labor Party—which was an anathema to those who remained in the IWW.

Its first test was the Railway Shopmen's strike of 1922, which was crushed by the employers with the help of an injunction that prohibited strikers from trying to dissuade strikebreakers from taking their jobs by any means, including word of mouth or newspaper interviews. TUEL leafleted at picket lines and continued to press for amalgamation of the separate craft unions in the industry.

TUEL also intervened in the internal politics of the United Mine Workers of America, where Alexander Howat was leading a revolt of miners from Kansas, Illinois, British Columbia and Nova Scotia against the regime of John L. Lewis. Lewis responded by ejecting all those connected with the insurgency from the union in 1923.

The Farmer-Labor Party

Foster had enjoyed a close relationship with John Fitzpatrick of the Chicago Federation of Labor. Those relations were strained to the breaking point by the Party's decision to pack the convention that Fitzpatrick had called to form a new Farmer-Labor Party.

Fitzpatrick's project presented Foster with a paradox: he did not think that electoral politics had much potential for advancing the rights of workers, much less revolutionary goals, and he had even less regard for progressive reformists such as Robert La Follette, Sr. On the other hand, he was attacked from the left within the party for his relations with Fitzpatrick and the CFL, which were denounced as too conservative. Even so, John Pepper, the Comintern's representative in the U.S., and those, such as Charles Ruthenberg, who had criticized Foster for his closeness to Fitzpatrick now directed Foster to make the CPUSA an important player in this new party. At the same time the Party's newspaper, then known as The Worker, published a flattering article about Foster in 1923 that identified him as a Communist, something he had to that point avoided admitting.

Fitzpatrick began to distance himself from Foster when his membership in the Communist Party became public knowledge. Foster and the CP, on the other hand, had enough influence within the CFL to be able to dominate the founding convention with representatives of various organizations, some of them existing only on paper. When the CP appeared to have taken over this new party, Fitzpatrick walked out, leaving the CP with a stillborn organization. From that point forward Fitzpatrick campaigned against TUEL and the AFL began expelling communists from its ranks with a vengeance. The Party likewise split the Minnesota-Farmer Labor Party and repudiated any common work with La Follette. After a disastrous showing in the 1924 elections, the Party dismantled the Federated Farmer-Labor Party it had created.

The split with Fitzpatrick led to the isolation within the labor movement. While Foster and the CP had enjoyed a close relation with Sidney Hillman and the Amalgamated Clothing Workers of America, it began organizing an opposition caucus within the ACWA. Hillman declared the TUEL formation to be a dual union and suspended its leaders, including Benjamin Gitlow.

Setbacks and successes

Foster profited in a way from this debacle: he was able to persuade the Comintern to recall Pepper, with whom he had quarrelled  over questions of tactics, and the dissolution of the FF-LP was a setback for the Charles Ruthenberg – Jay Lovestone faction, which was largely made up of foreign-born workers and represented the vast majority of the party membership. Forming an alliance with a smaller faction led by James P. Cannon, Foster was able to control the majority of the party's leadership in 1923 and again in 1925.

The internecine struggles between the two camps was, however, disturbing to the Comintern, which sent a representative to oversee the Party's 1925 convention. A telegram from the Comintern directed the Party, after a vote which Foster had won decisively over his opponent, Benjamin Gitlow, to install Ruthenberg as general secretary of the Party. Displaying uncharacteristically overt anger, Foster challenged the telegram, stormed out of the meeting, and attempted to appeal to the Comintern itself, over the objections of his opponents and even his allies in the Cannon faction, who would not accept the possibility that the Comintern could be wrong.

Foster did not succeed in reversing the Comintern's overturning of his election, but did obtain some concessions: his supporters were given control of the Trade Union Committee within the Party and the Comintern recognized trade union work as the most important sphere of activity for the Party. While Foster thought that he had obtained support for effective independence for TUEL, however, he was mistaken.

The Party's trade union work in this era, however, went from one disaster to the next. Rivalries within the CPUSA led to the loss of the 1926 New York dressmakers' strike, as neither the Foster or Ruthenberg faction wanted to appear to sell out by accepting a settlement that the Party's members within the strike leadership had recommended. As a result, the Party, which had once held leadership positions within every major New York City local of the International Ladies' Garment Workers' Union other than the cutters local led by David Dubinsky, was wholly routed.

The Foster and Ruthenberg factions likewise blamed each other for the defeat of the 1926 strike of textile workers in Passaic, New Jersey, in which the Ruthenberg leadership supported an overt Party role in the strike and what amounted to creation of a dual union. When it appeared that the leadership's communist leanings were an obstacle to negotiations, TUEL handed the strike over to the United Textile Workers, which was unable to make any more progress than the CP leadership had.

Foster also played a major role in the revolt against John L. Lewis' leadership in the United Mine Workers of America. John Brophy, a leader of the UMWA in Western Pennsylvania, ran against Lewis under the banner of "Save the Union". Brophy might have won if the ballots had been counted honestly, but they were not. Even so, the dissidents retained substantial prestige within the union and were able to establish themselves as a union administration in exile during the 1927 coal strike, running a separate program of strike relief that allowed the strike to continue when the Lewis Administration proved unable to do so.

These efforts were leading in the direction of formation of a rival union, something that Foster rejected but which appeared to be the only possibility left to the Party. As signals from the Comintern indicated the impending change of policy in the Third Period, when the American party was directed to abandon its work within the AFL in order to form separate revolutionary unions, even former supporters of Foster, such as Earl Browder, began criticizing Foster for his reluctance to form a dual union of miners. As it turned out, Foster's halting efforts to establish a separate power center within the UMWA had this effect in any case, as Howat, Brophy and his allies dropped out of the "Save the Union" movement as the CP's leadership in it became apparent. The Party founded its own National Miners Union in 1928.

In 1928 it also founded the National Textile Workers Union, which in 1929 attempted to organise in union-free North Carolina. The Loray Mill strike in Gastonia ended in a bitter defeat for the workers and the trial and conviction of seven NTWU organizers for conspiracy in the killing of the local police chief. The lead organizer and defendant, Fred Beal later charged that Foster had "directed the whole Gastonia show and that the people in the Kremlin insisted on getting weekly reports". In its instructions to a loyal witness, and with a view to creating martyrs around which an international campaign could be mounted, Beal believed that the party deliberately sabotaged the defense strategy of sticking to the facts of the case and avoiding inflammatory political statements.

Foster's return to power

C. E. Ruthenberg died on March 2, 1927, and his longtime factional ally Jay Lovestone took over his position as Executive Secretary of the party. The factional fighting between the Foster and Lovestone groups continued, but now became overshadowed by the larger struggle in the Soviet Union between Joseph Stalin and his opponents.

A firm supporter of Joseph Stalin, Foster split with James P. Cannon in 1928 and supported his former ally's expulsion for Trotskyism. Foster was made General Secretary of the party in 1929 with the support of the Comintern, deposing Jay Lovestone, who was sympathetic to Bukharin and whose policies of American exceptionalism were anathema to Stalin's new Third Period line.

That Third Period line also called for creation of new, revolutionary unions outside the AFL. While Foster had always denounced dual unionism, he dutifully complied with the Comintern's directive, renaming the Trade Union Education League as the Trade Union Unity League. Foster and the Party also followed the line by denouncing social democrats as "social fascists".

Eclipse and return to power

Foster began to lose power within the Party, due to his imprisonment during the Party's convention in 1930 and his continuing differences with others in the Party over trade union policies. In 1930, he ran for Governor of New York on the Communist ticket.

Foster was nominated for president yet again in 1932, but he suffered a heart attack on the campaign trail and was forced to step down as leader of the party in favor of Earl Browder. Sent to the Soviet Union for treatment, Foster's condition only grew worse. A period followed in which Foster was separated from political activity.

Foster returned to politics late in 1935, but was estranged from Browder and those who had risen to power in his absence. While the Party's trade union policies in the Popular Front era was close to what Foster had advocated in the 1920s, the Party's strength was not in the areas in which it had been active during the TUEL era — garment, railroads, and mining — but in the mass production industries with little history of union organization — automobile and electrical manufacturing, meatpacking, longshore on the west coast, maritime on the east coast, hard rock mining and lumber in the west and public transit in New York City. In the meantime the Party began building a small-scale personality cult around Browder and became a supporter of the New Deal and, to a lesser extent, the Roosevelt administration both of which Foster was critical. Foster became the "loyal opposition" to Browder within the CPUSA while remaining an unwavering supporter of Stalin.

Browder was removed in 1945 due to having attempted to dissolve the CPUSA as a party. Foster had, in fact, been one of the most vocal opponents in 1944 of Browder's decisions to rename the CPUSA as the Communist Political Association and to propose the continuation of the no-strike pledge after the end of World War II. The entire leadership of the Party came to Browder's defense then; the Comintern directed Foster to withdraw his criticisms.

Foster's letter to the National Committee subsequently formed the basis for the Duclos letter published as the Cold War began in 1945 that signaled the Soviet Union's change in line. The Party members who had denounced Foster and questioned his grasp of Marxism and his mental faculties a year earlier now condemned Browder as a class traitor. The CPA reestablished itself as the Communist Party USA and expelled Browder. While Foster nominally shared power with Eugene Dennis and John Williamson, he had the most prestige of the three.

During Foster's leadership the Party took a harder line, both internationally and internally, shedding much of the "Americanist" rhetoric of Browder's dozen years in leadership. Foster published a "new history" of America, which was highly praised in Moscow and was translated into many languages. Of it Browder wrote, "This extraordinary book interpreted the history of America from its discovery to the present, as an orgy of 'bloody banditry' and imperialism, enriching itself by 'drinking the rich red blood' of other peoples.

The Party campaigned vigorously for Henry A. Wallace's candidacy for president in 1948 — which failed to produce a viable Progressive Party. The failure of the campaign and the onset of the Cold War contributed to a disastrous situation for the unions and union leaders associated with the Party within the CIO, which expelled most of them by 1950.

In 1948 Foster was among the party leaders indicted for subversive activity under the Smith Act, but, because of his precarious health, he was not brought to trial. The Party began to implode as a result of these prosecutions, as many Party leaders chose to go underground after the Supreme Court upheld the conviction of the first tier of CPUSA leaders in United States v. Dennis, . Foster also presided over a number of internal purges.

Foster supported Joseph Stalin and the Communist Party of the Soviet Union. He rallied the party's faithful during the Soviet Union's military intervention in Hungary and Nikita Khrushchev's denunciation of Stalin at the 1956 Twentieth Party Congress. Foster retired in 1957 and assumed the title of Chairman emeritus of the party to make way for the younger Gus Hall. Like Foster, Gus Hall was also a loyal ally of the Communist Party of the Soviet Union.

He was in Moscow for his 80th birthday on February 25, 1961.

Death and legacy

Foster died on September 1, 1961, in Moscow. The Soviet Union gave him a state funeral in Red Square and Khrushchev personally headed the honor guard. His ashes were interred with John Reed and Bill Haywood. His book Toward Soviet America remains a favorite among American communists, and has been continuously republished by both leftists and anti-communists who see it as scandalous. One edition of the book was published with the subtitle "The Book the Communists tried to Destroy!"

The founding documents of the Progressive Labor Party portrayed Foster as representing the best side of the Communist Party, while blaming reformist and revisionist tendencies on Earl Browder. Many of the groups of the 1970s New Communist Movement eulogized and upheld Foster as their icon. Many biographies of Foster have been published by American academics and historians.

The American Party of Labor claims descent from Foster and his secretary and aide, Jack Shulman.

Footnotes

Works

Books and pamphlets
 Insurgency: or, the economic power of the middle class (with Hermon Titus), Seattle, Wash: Trustee Print. Co., 1910.
 Syndicalism (with Earl Ford), Chicago, IL: W.Z. Foster, 1913.
 Trade Unionism: The Road to Freedom, Chicago, IL: International Trade Union Educational League, 1916.
 General Report on Steel Strike Relief Fund, Pittsburgh, PA: National Committee for Organizing Iron and Steel Workers, 1920.
 The Great Steel Strike and Its Lessons, New York: B. W. Huebsch, 1920.
 The Railroaders' Next Step — Amalgamation, Chicago, IL: Trade Union Educational League, 1922.
 The Russian Revolution, Chicago, IL: Trade Union Educational League, 1922.
 The Revolutionary Crisis of 1918-1921: In Germany, England, Italy and France, Chicago, IL: Trade Union Educational League, 1922.
 The Bankruptcy of the American Labor Movement, Chicago, IL: Trade Union Educational League, 1922.
The Principles and Program of the Trade Union Educational League, Chicago, IL: Trade Union Educational League, 1922.
Russia in 1924, Chicago, IL: Trade Union Educational League, 1924.
Russian workers and workshops in 1926 Chicago, IL: Trade Union Educational League, 1926.
 Organize the Unorganized, Chicago, IL: Trade Union Educational League, 1926.
Strike Strategy, Chicago, Ill.: The Trade Union Educational League 1926 (Labor Herald Library #18) alternate link
Misleaders of Labor, Chicago, IL: Trade Union Educational League, 1927.
The Watson-Parker law, the latest scheme to hamstring railroad unionism, Chicago, Ill.: The Trade Union Educational League, 1927 (Labor Herald Library #19).
 Wrecking the labor banks; the collapse of the labor banks and investment companies of the Brotherhood of locomotive engineers. Chicago, IL: Trade Union Educational League, 1927.
Victorious socialist construction in the Soviet Union, New York: Trade Union Unity League, 1930.
Fight against hunger, New York: Workers' Library Publishers, 1930.
Little brothers of the big labor fakers: report of a speech against the Conference for Progressive Labor Action, made in New Star Casino, New York City on May 10, 1931, New York: Trade Union Unity League, 1931.
The words and deeds of Franklin D. Roosevelt, New York: Workers' Library Publishers, 1932.
Toward soviet America New York, Coward-McCann, Inc, 1932.
Industrial unionism, New York: Workers' Library Publishers, 1936.
The crisis in the Socialist party, New York: Workers' Library Publishers, 1936.
Unionizing steel, New York: Workers' Library Publishers, 1936.
Organizing methods in the steel industry, New York: Workers' Library Publishers, 1936.
Questions and answers on the Piatakov-Radek trial, New York: Workers' Library Publishers, 1937.
What means a strike in steel, New York: Workers' Library Publishers, 1937.
A manual of industrial unionism, organizational structure and policies, New York: Workers' Library Publishers, 1937.
Railroad workers forward!, New York: Workers' Library Publishers, 1937.
From Bryan to Stalin, New York: International Publishers, 1937.
Halt the railroad wage-cut, New York: Workers' Library Publishers, 1938.
The revolutionary and socialist traditions of American labor, Minneapolis, Minn.: Minnesota State Committee, Communist Party U.S.A.?,  1938.
Stop wage-cuts & layoffs on the railroads; a reply to President T.C. Cashen of the Switchmen's Union of North America, New York: Workers' Library Publishers, 1938.
Your questions answered on politics, peace, economics anti-semitism, race prejudice, religion, trade unionism, Americanism, democracy, socialism, communism, New York: Workers' Library Publishers, June 1939.
 Pages from a Worker's Life, New York: International Publishers, 1939.
The war crisis: questions and answers, New York: Workers' Library Publishers, January 1940.
Capitalism, socialism, and the war, New York: Workers' Library Publishers, June 1940.
What's what about the war; questions and answers, New York: Workers' Library Publishers, July 1940.
The United States and the Soviet union, New York: Workers' Library Publishers, December 1940.
Roosevelt heads for war, New York: Workers' Library Publishers, 1940.
Socialism: the road to peace, prosperity and freedom New York: Workers' Library Publishers 1941 "Published on the occasion of the sixtieth anniversary celebration of William Z. Foster".
Communism versus fascism; a reply to those who lump together the social systems of the Soviet Union and Nazi Germany, New York: Workers' Library Publishers, 1941.
The Soviet Union: friend and ally of the American people, New York: Workers' Library Publishers, October 1941.
Defend America by smashing Hitlerism, New York: Workers' Library Publishers, 1941.
World capitalism and world socialism, New York: Workers' Library Publishers, 1941.
The railroad workers and the War, New York: Workers' Library Publishers, 1941.
Labor and the war, New York, Workers Library Publishers, January 1942. alternate link
Steel workers and the war, New York: Workers' Library Publishers, 1942.
The trade unions and the war, New York: Workers' Library Publishers, 1942.
American democracy and the war, New York: Workers' Library Publishers, 1942.
Smash Hitler's spring offensive now!, New York: Workers' Library Publishers, 1942.
The U.S.A. and the U.S.S.R., war allies and friends, New York: Workers' Library Publishers, 1942.
From defense to attack: the United Nations seize the initiative, New York: Workers' Library Publishers, 1942.
The people and the Congress, New York: Workers' Library Publishers, February 1943.
For speedy victory: The second front now, New York: Workers' Library Publishers, October 1943.
Soviet democracy and the war, New York: Workers' Library Publishers, December 1943.
The Soviet trade unions and allied labor unity, New York: Workers' Library Publishers, 1943.
Organized labor faces the new world, New York: New Century Publishers March 1945.
The strike situation, and organized labor's wage and job strategy, New York: New Century Publishers, 1945 (with cartoons by Hugo Gellert and William Gropper).
The coal miners, their problems in war and peace, New York: New Century Publishers, 1945.
The Rankin witch hunt, New York: New Century Publishers, 1945.
Reaction beats its war drums, New York: New Century Publishers, 1946.
The menace of a new world war, New York: New Century Publishers, 1946.
Palestine: problem and solution, New York: Issued by Communist Party, New York State, 1946.
Our country needs a strong Communist Party, New York: New Century Publishers, 1946.
Problems of organized labor today, New York: New Century Publishers, 1946.
A message to America's coal miners, New York: Communist Party, U.S.A., 1947.
Quarantine the warmongers, New York: New Century Publishers, November 1947.
Workers, defend your unions!, New York: New Century Publishers, 1947.
Organized labor and the Fascist danger, New York: New Century Publishers, 1947.
The meaning of the 9-party Communist conference, New York: New Century Publishers, 1947.
The New Europe, New York: International Publishers 1947.
 American Trade Unionism: Principles and Organization, Strategy and Tactics, New York: International Publishers, 1947.
Beware of the war danger!: stop, look and listen!, New York: New Century Publishers, 1948.
Radio address by William Z. Foster, delivered at Madison Square Garden, August 2, 1948, New York:  Communist Party, U.S.A., 1948.
On improving the Party's work among women New York: New Century Publishers, 1948.
Danger ahead for organized labor, New York: New Century Publishers, 1948.
Labor and the Marshall plan, New York: New Century Publishers, March 1948.
The crime of El Fanguito: an open letter to President Truman on Puerto Rico, New York: New Century Publishers, 1948.
N.Y. Herald Tribune's 23 questions about the Communist Party answered by William Z. Foster, New York: New Century Publishers, 1948.
The Economic Crisis and the Cold War: Reports Presented to a Conference on 'Managed Economy,' the 'Cold War,' and the Developing Economic Crisis, New York: New Century Publishers, 1949.
In defense of the Communist Party and the indicted leaders, New York: New Century Publishers, 1949.
 *The Twilight of World Capitalism, International Publishers, 1949.
Outline Political History of the Americas, New York: International Publishers 1951.
A letter to Congress: defeat the anti-labor Smith Bill!, New York: New Century Publishers, 1952.
The steel workers and the fight for labor's rights, New York: New Century Publishers, 1952.
 History of the Communist Party of the United States, New York: International Publishers, 1952.
Danger signals for organized labor, New York: New Century Publishers, 1953.
The Negro people in American History, New York: International Publishers, 1954.
History of the three Internationals; the world socialist and communist movements from 1848 to the present, New York: International Publishers, 1955.
Outline History of the World Trade Union Movement, New York: International Publishers, 1956.
The Historic Advance of World Socialism New York: International Publishers, 1960.
More pages from a worker's life edited, and with an introduction by Arthur Zipser. AIMS Occasional paper #32. New York: American Institute for Marxist Studies, 1979.

Introductions, articles, contributions etc.
 "The Socialist and Syndicalist Movements in France", Industrial Worker, vol. 3, no. 1, whole 105 (March 23, 1911), pp. 1, 4.
Trade Unions in America (with James P. Cannon and Earl Browder), Chicago, Ill.: Published for the Trade Union Educational League by the Daily Worker 1925 (Little red library #1).
Acceptance Speeches (with Benjamin Gitlow), New York: Workers Library Publishers, 1928; accepting the parties' presidential nomination.
Foster and Ford for Food and Freedom: Acceptance Speeches of William Z. Foster and James W. Ford, Communist Candidates for President and Vice-President of the United States of America (with James W. Ford), New York: Workers' Library Publishers 1932.
Technocracy and Marxism. (with Earl Browder and Vyacheslav Molotov), New York: Workers' Library Publishers 1933.
Get Wise—Organize: What Every Young Steel Worker Should Know, New York: National Committee of the Young Communist League, 1937
Party Building and Political Leadership (with several others), New York: Workers Library Publishers, 1937
Letters from Spain by Joe Dallet, American volunteer, to his wife ; introductory articles by William Z. Foster, New York: Workers Library Publishers, 1938
The meaning of the Soviet trials, by E. Yaroslavsky, including the official text of the indictment of the Bukharin-Trotskyite bloc. Introduction by William Z. Foster, New York: Workers Library Publishers, 1938.
The Path of Browder and Foster (with others), New York: Workers'Library Publishers, 1941.
The Fight Against Hitlerism (with Robert Minor, New York: Workers Library Publishers, 1941.
Speed the Second Front (with Browder, Israel Amter and Max Weiss), New York: Workers Library Publishers, 1942.
America at the Crossroads: Postwar Problems and Communist Policy by Eugene Dennis (foreword), New York: New Century Publishers, 1945.
The Menace of American Imperialism (with Eugene Dennis), New York: New Century Publishers, 1945.
Marxism-Leninism vs. Revisionism (with others), New York: New Century Publishers, 1946.
On the struggle against revisionism New York: National Veterans Committee of the Communist Party, 1946.
Are communism and democracy mutually antagonistic? Washington, Ransdell, 1946 (Panel Discussion with Clare Boothe Luce, William Henry Chamberlin and Harry F. Ward; moderated by Theodore Granik).
The Communist position on the Negro question, New York: New Century Publishers, 1947.
An Open Letter to All Members of the Communist Party (with Eugene Dennis and Henry Winston), New York: Communist Party, U.S.A., 1948.
The case of Puerto Rico: memorandum to the United Nations by the Communist Party of Puerto Rico (intro), New York: New Century Publishers, 1953.
Marxism vs Keynesism (with Celeste Strack and John Eaton), Los Angeles, CA: Progressive Book Shop, 1955.

See also

 Communists in the U.S. Labor Movement (1919-1937)
 Communists in the U.S. Labor Movement (1937-1950)
 Industrial Workers of the World
 The Communist Party and African-Americans
 Communist Party, USA
 Toward Soviet America
 From Bryan to Stalin

Further reading

 Barrett, James R., William Z. Foster and the Tragedy of American Radicalism. Urbana, IL: University of Illinois Press, 1999.
 Devinatz, Victor G., "The Labor Philosophy of William Z. Foster: From the IWW to the TUEL,"  International Social Science Review, vol. 71, no. 1/2 (1996), pp. 3–13. In JSTOR
 Draper, Theodore, The Roots of American Communism, New York: Viking Press, 1957.
 Draper, Theodore, American Communism and Soviet Russia, 1960.

 Johanningsmeier, Edward P. "From Haymarket to Mao? The Radicalism of William Z. Foster." in Post-Cold War Revelations and the American Communist Party: Citizens, Revolutionaries, and Spies (2021): 65+.
 Johanningsmeier, Edward, Forging American Communism: The Life of William Z. Foster, Princeton: Princeton University Press, 1994.
 Johanningsmeier, Edward, "Philadelphia 'Skittereen' and William Z. Foster: The Childhood of an American Communist," Pennsylvania Magazine of History and Biography, vol. 117, no. 4 (October 1993), pp. 287–308. In JSTOR.

 Murray, Robert K. "Communism and the Great Steel Strike of 1919" The Mississippi Valley Historical Review, Vol. 38, No. 3. (Dec., 1951), pp. 445–66. JSTOR
 Pedersen, Vernon L. The communist party on the American waterfront: Revolution, reform, and the quest for power Lexington Books, 2019.

 Storch, Randi, Red Chicago: American Communism at its Grassroots, 1928-35, Urbana, IL: University of Illinois Press, 2007.
 Turner, Victor W. The roots of American communism. Routledge, 2018.

 Zipser, Arthur, Workingclass Giant: The Life of William Z. Foster, New York: International Publishers, 1981.

External links
 William Z. Foster Writings on Marxists Internet Archive.
 Trade Union Educational League documents  found at the Marxist Internet Archive.
 The Trial of William Z. Foster PDF document by Robert Minor. The Liberator, v. 6, no. 4, whole no. 60 (April 1923), pp. 8–12.
 The Question of the Unorganized William Z. Foster. 1925
 Organizational Problems of Industrial Unionism William Z. Foster.
 The Radical Pamphlet Collection at the Library of Congress contains materials relating to the presidential campaign of William Z. Foster.
 
 
Widespread industrial unrest was the talk of Labor Day 1920 - Pantagraph (Bloomington, Illinois newspaper)

 
1881 births
1961 deaths
Politicians from Taunton, Massachusetts
Stalinism
Anti-revisionists
American Comintern people
Candidates in the 1924 United States presidential election
Candidates in the 1928 United States presidential election
Candidates in the 1932 United States presidential election
20th-century American politicians
Industrial Workers of the World members
American trade unionists
American syndicalists
American people of Irish descent
Communist Party USA politicians
Socialist Party of America politicians from Washington (state)
American Marxists